Linwood is a village with its own post office in the towns of Northbridge and Uxbridge, Massachusetts.

The zip code of the Linwood post office is 01525. As a village of both Uxbridge and Northbridge, Linwood has separate municipal services from Uxbridge or Northbridge, for fire, police, EMS, School district, public works, and other services, depending on the town (township) boundary. Worcester County, Massachusetts Sheriff, Lewis Evangelidis runs corrections, and court services from West Boylston, and Worcester District is the regional judicial jurisdiction. The Uxbridge district court serves surrounding towns. Linwood is closest to the villages of Whitinsville, and North Uxbridge. The village of Linwood was predominantly settled by French Canadians, who historically worked in the local textile industry. The Whitin Cotton Mills at Linwood were the principal industry and are a good example of the industrial architecture of the 19th century.

The Whitin Cotton Mill
The damming of the Mumford River in the early 19th century provided water power and led to the development of the Whitin Machine Works, the Cotton Mill and Linwood Mill. The mills also had access to a trunk line of the Providence and Worcester Railroad allowing easy transportation of goods into and out of the manufacturing facilities.

In 2011, the Linwood Mill was developed into 75 studio, one bedroom, and two bedroom units of 55+ ‘active adult’ senior rental residences.

The ground floor of the Linwood Mill was developed into 22,000 square feet of commercial space including a restaurant, the Blackstone Valley Chamber of Commerce, office space, and a wine store.

Current businesses located in the Linwood Mill include the following:

National Register listings

The Butler Block in Linwood is listed on the National Historic Register, under Uxbridge, Massachusetts. The Linwood Cotton Mills are also listed on the National Historic Register. The Linwood Historic District includes late Victorian Structures, the Linwood Cotton Mills, and extends down Linwood Avenue to Pine and Maple. The Blackstone Valley and Linwood are now part of the Blackstone River Valley National Heritage Corridor, the oldest industrialized region in the United States. The Blackstone Valley is New England's Historic National Park area. Built in 1866, the Linwood Mill was the crowning glory of James Fletcher Whitin and Charles Pinckney Whitin, sons of Colonel Paul and Betsy (Fletcher) Whitin.

Gallery

See also
 List of mill towns in Massachusetts

References

Uxbridge, Massachusetts
Villages in Worcester County, Massachusetts
Villages in Massachusetts
Northborough, Massachusetts